Melvin Mercedes (born November 2, 1990) is a Dominican former professional baseball pitcher. He played in Major League Baseball (MLB) in one game for the Detroit Tigers on August 15, 2014.

Professional career

Detroit Tigers
The Detroit Tigers purchased Mercedes' contract after the 2012 season, adding him to their 40-man roster.

The Tigers promoted Mercedes to the major leagues on August 14, 2014. Before being called up, Mercedes had a 4.33 ERA and a 1.33 WHIP in 41 appearances for the Triple-A Toledo Mud Hens. Mercedes made his major league debut on August 15, when he pitched two scoreless innings, allowing no hits or walks, and recording two strikeouts. On August 17, Mercedes was optioned back to the Toledo Mud Hens. On December 11, 2014, Mercedes was designated for assignment by the Tigers. On December 19, 2014, Mercedes was outrighted to Triple-A Toledo.

During the 2015 season, he split time between the Double-A Erie SeaWolves and Triple-A Toledo Mud Hens. On December 23, 2015, the Tigers re-signed Mercedes to a minor league contract. On March 23, 2016, Mercedes was released by the Tigers.

Guerreros de Oaxaca
On May 6, 2016, Mercedes signed with the Guerreros de Oaxaca of the Mexican Baseball League. He was released on July 7, 2016.

York Revolution
On April 5, 2017, Mercedes signed with the York Revolution of the Atlantic League of Professional Baseball. He was released on May 14, 2017.

References

External links

1990 births
Cardenales de Lara players
Connecticut Tigers players
Detroit Tigers players
Dominican Republic expatriate baseball players in Mexico
Dominican Republic expatriate baseball players in the United States
Dominican Summer League Tigers players
Guerreros de Oaxaca players
Erie SeaWolves players
Gulf Coast Tigers players
Lakeland Flying Tigers players

Living people
Major League Baseball pitchers
Major League Baseball players from the Dominican Republic
Mexican League baseball pitchers
People from El Seibo Province
Toledo Mud Hens players
Toros del Este players
West Michigan Whitecaps players
York Revolution players
Dominican Republic expatriate baseball players in Venezuela